Maria Monaci Gallenga (1880–1944) was an Italian textile designer and fashion designer. Along with her husband, Gallenga invented a unique metallic, block printing technique for fabrics that gave her textiles a distinct hue.

Early life
Maria Monaci Gallenga was born in Rome in 1880. Born into a prominent family of academics, as a young girl she was fascinated with history and particularly in medieval and Renaissance Italian art history. In 1903 she married Peter Gallenga, a professor at the University of Rome.

Career
Gallenga started designing and making textiles and clothing in 1914 out of a studio in Florence. She often exhibited her designs in art exhibitions. These designs combined a unique mixture of old world motifs, such as heavy velvet and medieval patterns, with more modern 1920s silhouettes. Gallenga also had a flair for theatricality and designed many cloaks and capes. In 1923, Gallenga was awarded a Silver Medal at the Monza design exhibition. In 1928, Gallenga co-founded the Boutique Italienne in Paris with the designers Bice Pittoni and Carla Visconti di Modrone.

In line with her passion for history, many of her textile pattern titles reference medieval and Renaissance history. For example, the "Mona Tessa" is a reference to the mother of Beatrice Portinari, the muse of Dante Alighieri.

Death
Gallenga died in 1944 in Italy.

Public collections
Gallenga's work can be found in a number of public institutions, including:

Fine Arts Museum of San Francisco
RISD Museum
Philadelphia Museum of Art
Victoria and Albert Museum 
Art Institute of Chicago
Metropolitan Museum of Art
Ulster Museum

References

1880 births
1944 deaths
Italian textile designers
Fashion designers from Florence
Italian women fashion designers
Artists from Rome